Toongabbie may refer to:
Toongabbie, New South Wales
Old Toongabbie, New South Wales
Toongabbie, Victoria
Electoral district of Toongabbie